Delphine Depardieu (born 8 March 1979) is a French actress. She is Alain Depardieu's daughter, and Gérard Depardieu's niece. After her training at the École internationale de création audiovisuelle et de réalisation (EICAR), at the Cours Simon and Jean-Laurent Cochet's course, she was rapidly drawn to the stage and the cinema.
On stage, she has acted with Roland Giraud, Paul Belmondo and Alexandre Brasseur.

Filmography

Cinema 
 2006 : Antonio Vivaldi, un prince à Venise  directed by Jean-Louis Guillermou
 2006 : Lisa et le pilote d’avion directed by Philippe Barassat
 2008 : Astérix aux Jeux olympiques directed by Thomas Langmann
 2009 : Une affaire d'État directed by Éric Valette
 2010 : Streamfield, les carnets noirs directed by Jean-Luc Miesch
 2011 : Equinoxe directed by Laurent Carcélès 
 2014 : Hasta mañana directed by Sébastien Maggiani and Olivier Vidal
 2016 : La Dormeuse Duval directed by Manuel Sanchez from the novel Les bottes rouges written by Franz Bartelt

Video clips 
 2008 : Je monte la garde by   Subway 
 2012 : Chope la!, by PP Noc

Video recording of stage play 
 2011 : De filles en aiguilles (Shady Business) by Robin Hawdon, (French adaptation by Stewart Vaughan and Jean-Christophe Barc), directed by Jacques Décombe, filmed at the Théâtre de la Michodière Paris

Short movies 
 2004 : Last game directed by Fred Bargain
 2004 : La Légende des Mille étangs directed by Alain Baptizet 
 2004 : La musique adoucit les meurtres directed by Jean-Pierre Ybert and Eve Laudenback 
 2006 : Jusqu'au noir directed by Jean-Benoit Souil 
 2012 : Bonjour Madame Bonjour Monsieur directed by Mohamed Fekrane

Television 
 2003 : Rose et Val, directed by Stéphane Kappes : 
 2005 : Julie Lescaut - une affaire jugée -, directed by Daniel Janneau :
 2008 : Duval et Moretti - César à deux doigts de la mort -, directed by Denis Amar :
 2014 : Dame de feu, directed by Camille Bordes-Resnais and Alexis Lecaye :

Artistic director 
 show : Naho, tellement folle!

Theatre 
 2002 : Chute de vie, directed by Jean-Benoit Souil, Salon d’honneur de l'Hôtel des Invalides Paris 
 2006 : Délit de fuites by Jean-Claude Islert, directed by Jean-Luc Moreau, with Roland Giraud, Théâtre de la Michodière Paris
 2008 : Traitement de choc by Chris Orlandi, directed by Olivier Belmondo, Théâtre du Petit Gymnase Paris
 2008 : Jupe obligatoire by Nathalie Vierne, directed by Nathalie Vierne, Audience award at the Prix Raimu de la comédie (2009),
 2009 : Un oreiller ou trois, (Why Not Stay for Breakfast) by Ray Cooney and Gene Stone, (French adaptation by Stewart Vaughan and Jean-Claude Islert), directed by Olivier Belmondo, with Paul Belmondo, Théâtre des Nouveautés Paris
 2009 : Le Bug by Richard Strand, directed by Beata Nilska, Théâtre La Bruyère Paris
 2010 : Le Misanthrope ou l'Atrabilaire amoureux by Molière, directed by Nicolas Rigas, Théâtre du Petit Monde, Festival Off d'Avignon
 2010 : Aimer by Paul Géraldy, Espace La Comedia
 2011 : Ménage à trois by Roberto Traverso, directed by Marco Rampoldi, production Théâtre français de Milan, Teatro Franco Parenti
 2011 : Bouleversé(e), directed by Anouche Setbon and Bruno Banon, Théâtre de l'Atelier
 2011 : De filles en aiguilles (Shady Business) by Robin Hawdon, (French adaptation by Stewart Vaughan and Jean-Christophe Barc), directed by Jacques Décombe, Théâtre de la Michodière Paris
 2012 : Plus vraie que nature  by Martial Courcier, directed by Raphaëlle Cambray, with Paul Belmondo and Jean Martinez, Comédie Bastille Paris
 2013 : Full of life from John Fante 's novel, with Bruno Conan and off-voices of Delphine Depardieu and Popeck
 2014 : La Pèlerine écossaise by Sacha Guitry, directed by Pierre Laville, Théâtre Daunou Paris
 2015 : La chanson des nuages by David Friszman, directed by David Friszman, Théâtre Au coin de la lune, Avignon
 2015 :  Un Deux Trois... Soleil by Christelle George, directed by Michel Voletti, Théâtre Le Ranelagh, Paris
 2016 :  Le dernier baiser de Mozart by Alain Teulié , directed by Raphaëlle Cambray, Théâtre Actuel Festival off d'Avignon and theatre Petit Montparnasse, Paris
 2017 :  L'Aigle à deux têtes by Jean Cocteau , directed by Issame Chayle, Théâtre Le Ranelagh, Paris

Honours and awards 
 2014 : nominated best actress in a supporting role at the "Southampton International Film Festival" for Hasta mañana directed by Sébastien Maggiani and Olivier Vidal

References

External links 

 
 http://www.allocine.fr/personne/fichepersonne_gen_cpersonne=147618.html
 :fr:Delphine Depardieu

1979 births
Living people
French television actresses
French film actresses
Delphine